The Treaty of Brest-Litovsk was an exclusive protectorate treaty ("peace for bread") signed on 9 February 1918 between the Central Powers and the Ukrainian People's Republic, recognizing the latter's sovereignty.  It was part of the same negotiations that took place in Brest-Litovsk, Grodno Governorate (now Brest, Belarus) that also produced the separate treaty of the same name between the Russian Soviet Federative Socialist Republic and the Central Powers on 3 March 1918 . 

Formerly a territory of the then-defunct Russian Empire, Germany and Austria-Hungary secured food-supply support in return for providing military protection. The Central Powers recognised Ukraine as a neutral state.

Background 
Because of the civil unrest in the Russian Republic culminating in the October Revolution , the Ukrainian People's Republic declared its independence under the government of the General Secretariat of Ukraine, which announced elections for the Ukrainian Constituent Assembly to be held on 9 January 1918 and the first convocation on January 22 of the same year. 

On 17 December 1917, Vladimir Lenin, as the head of the Sovnarkom, released an ultimatum in which he accused the Central Rada of disorganising the front lines, stopping "any troops going into the region of the Don, the Urals, or elsewhere"; sheltering political enemies such as the members of the Cadet Party and those who had sided with Kaledine and requiring to "put an end to the attempts to crush the armies of the Soviet and of the Red Guard in Ukraine". Lenin gave twenty-four hours' notice to the government of what he called "the independent and bourgeois Republic of the Ukraine" to respond. Since Soviet armies were already in Ukraine, the government of Ukraine had to act quickly to preserve the sovereignty of the state.

The Ukrainian Central Rada expressed a desire for a peace treaty with foreign countries and its recognition worldwide. Since the representatives of the British and the French Empires did not wish to recognise Ukrainian sovereignty, considering it as a part of their major ally, the Russian Empire, the treaty gave a chance for some recognition in the face of the Central Powers.

On 1 January 1918, a Ukrainian delegation, headed by Vsevolod Holubovych, arrived at Brest-Litovsk. The initial delegation beside Mykola Liubynsky, Oleksandr Sevriuk, and Mykola Levytsky included Mykhailo Poloz.

Peace negotiations

The peace negotiation was initiated on 3 December 1917 by the Russian Soviet Federative Socialist Republic government, represented by a delegation headed by the Ukrainian-born Leon Trotsky. Several resolutions were made from 22 to 26 December, and on 28 December 1917, an armistice was signed suspending hostilities at the front lines. A Soviet government of the Ukrainian Socialist Soviet Republic had been formed in Kharkiv on 17 December 1917. The final signing was being delayed by the Bolsheviks in the hope of reaching some agreement with the Entente treaty members.

On 12 January 1918, Count Ottokar Czernin, representing the Central Powers, recognised the independent delegation from the Ukrainian People's Republic but with Csáky refused to discuss the questions of Halychyna, Bucovina, and Subcarpathian Rus. They agreed that the Kholm Governorate and the region of Podlachia were part of the Ukrainian People's Republic. The Russian delegation, headed by Leon Trotsky, had at first also recognised the independent Ukrainian delegation on January 10.

On 20 January 1918, the Ukrainian delegation returned to Kiev, where the Tsentralna Rada proclaimed a fully-sovereign Ukrainian state on January 25 (dated January 22). Soon, a new Ukrainian delegation was sent to Brest headed by Oleksandr Sevriuk. Meanwhile, Bolshevik revolts occurred in several cities in Ukraine, which more or less forced the Ukrainian People's Republic, which was lacking organised military forces, to seek foreign aid. However, the situation for the Central Powers was also critical, especially for Austria-Hungary, which suffered severe food shortages.

On 1 February, a plenary session of the Congress was attended also by the Soviet government of Ukraine in the presence of Yukhym Medvediev and Vasyl' Shakhrai, but the Central Powers continued to negotiate with the delegation from the Ukrainian People's Republic as the sole representatives of Ukraine. While the Tsentralna Rada abandoned Kiev for Bolshevik troops, a peace treaty was signed in Brest-Litovsk during the night of February 8–9 over the Bolsheviks' protests. 

A special edition (Extrablatt) of the German newspaper Lübeckische Anzeigen printed an announcement on "Peace with the Ukraine": "Today on 9 February 1918 at 2 o'clock in the morning the Peace between the Quadruple Alliance and the Ukrainian People's Republic was signed".

Signatories

Within days of the treaty's signing, an army of over 450,000 men from the Central Powers entered Ukraine, and after only a month, most of the Bolshevik troops had left the country without any significant resistance. Soon after the takeover of Kiev by Ukrainian and German troops, the Tsentralna Rada could return to Kiev on March 2.

Terms

The treaty recognized the following as the Ukrainian People's Republic's boundaries: in the west, the 1914 Austro-Hungarian–Russian boundary, which excluded the Ukrainian Halychyna in the new Ukrainian state; in the north, the line running from Tarnogród, Biłgoraj, Szczebrzeszyn, Krasnystaw, Radzyń Podlaski and Międzyrzec Podlaski in the present Lublin Voivodeship (Poland); Sarnaki, in the present Masovian Voivodeship (Poland) and Kamyanyets and Pruzhany, in the present Brest Voblast (Belarus). The exact boundaries were to be determined by a mixed commission on the basis of ethnic composition and the will of the inhabitants (Article 2).

The treaty also provided for the regulated evacuation of the occupied regions (Article 3), the establishment of diplomatic relations (Article 4), mutual renunciation of war reparations (Article 5), the return of prisoners of war (Article 6) and the exchange of interned civilians and the renewal of public and private legal relations (Article 8). Article 7 provided for the immediate resumption of economic relations and trade and also set down the principles of accounting and tariffs.

Austria-Hungary and the Ukrainian People's Republic also signed a secret agreement regarding Halychyna and Bukovina. Austria-Hungary agreed to unify by 31 July 1918 into one crownland the areas of eastern Halychyna and Bukovina in which the Ukrainian population predominated, but on July 4, Austria-Hungary annulled the secret agreement under the pretext that Ukraine had not delivered to it the amount of grain promised under the treaty, but it is believed to be really the result of Polish pressure. On the other hand the reason for annulment was that after the Vienna's requested to keep the agreement secret, Sevriuk excited with signing of the Treaty of Brest-Litovsk disclosed the information to the Ukrainians of Lemberg (Lviv). The revelation of the secret in such way led Austria-Hungarians to destroy the copy of the agreement and later denied existence of it in any way, while Czernin soon resigned.

The Central Powers signed a separate Treaty of Brest-Litovsk with the Russian Soviet Federative Socialist Republic on 3 March 1918. Russia agreed to recognise the concluded treaty with the Ukrainian People's Republic and to sign a peace treaty with Ukraine immediately to define the borders between Russia and Ukraine without delay, to clear the Ukrainian territory of Russian troops and the Russian Red Guard and to put an end to all agitation or propaganda against the government or the public institutions of the Ukrainian People's Republic (article 6).

Aftermath

The treaty immediately caused much opposition among Poles, particularly those in Austria-Hungary. Polish politicians in the Austrian Parliament immediately began their protests, paralysing it; civil servants began a strike; and spontaneous demonstrations took place in various cities and towns. Most notably, the Polish Auxiliary Corps refused to follow imperial orders, and, after the Battle of Rarańcza, broke through the front lines to join Polish forces in the Russian Civil War. Although the imperial and royal government in Vienna withdrew from parts of the treaty, the damage inflicted on any remaining sense of loyalty or trust towards the monarchy among the Poles was devastating and beyond repairability, while the pro-Habsburg and anti-independence faction of the Polish politicians participating in the government suffered total humiliation and irreversible discreditation in the eyes of the Polish population which ceased to regard any possible Austro-Polish Solution as a viable option, focusing instead entirely on re-establishing independence.

The Treaty of Brest-Litovsk provided the Ukrainian People's Republic with German and Austro-Hungarian military aid in clearing Bolshevik forces from Ukraine in February–April 1918, but the treaty also meant that the Entente Powers suspended relations with the Ukrainian People's Republic.

Soon, however, the invited foreign forces from the Central Powers were seen as occupiers by a major part of the Ukrainian population and also parts of the Tsentralna Rada. In late April, the German Supreme Commander in Ukraine, Hermann von Eichhorn, issued an order making Ukrainians subject to German military courts for offenses against German interests, the First Ukrainian Division (the Blue coats) was disarmed and German soldiers even arrested two ministers after they had criticised the German actions. The final break with the Tsentralna Rada came on 29 April, when General Pavlo Skoropadskyi declared himself hetman of the Ukrainian state.

The Treaty of Rapallo of 1922 between Germany and Soviet Russia canceled the German commitments made at Brest-Litovsk. The disintegration of Austria-Hungary in late 1918 automatically annulled its commitments. Turkey renounced the Treaty of Brest-Litovsk by signing a treaty with the Ukrainian SSR in 1922. Only Bulgaria, as far as is known, did not formally annul the treaty.

References

Sources
Volodymyr Kubijovyč (ed.): Ukraine – A Concise Encyclopaedia I. University of Toronto Press 1963.
Orest Subtelny: Ukraine – A history. .
US Department of State. Proceedings of the Brest-Litovsk Peace Conference: the peace negotiations between Russia and the Central Powers 21 November 1917–3 March 1918. "Government Printing Office". Washington, 1918.

External links
Encyclopedia of Ukraine
The Peace Treaty of Brest-Litovsk 9 February 1918
The Peace Treaty of Brest-Litovsk 3 March 1918
Digital copy of the US Department of State book about the proceedings of the treaty.

Treaties concluded in 1918
Treaties entered into force in 1918
1918 in Belarus
History of Brest, Belarus
Peace treaties of Germany
World War I treaties
Treaties of Austria-Hungary
Peace treaties of Austria
Peace treaties of Bulgaria
Peace treaties of the Ottoman Empire
Treaties of the German Empire
Treaties of the Kingdom of Bulgaria
Treaties of the Ukrainian People's Republic
Peace treaties of Ukraine
Ukraine in World War I